St. Stanislaus - Bishop & Martyr Church is located at 123 Townsend Street, Buffalo, New York on the city's east side. The Church is the oldest Polish church in the Roman Catholic Diocese of Buffalo and holds the title of "Mother Church of Polonia" for western New York.

History
The parish was established on June 8, 1873, by Rev. Jan Pitass and the Society of Saint Stanislaus. The original church was a two-story, wood-frame church that was built in 1874. That church was converted to a school shortly after the present-day church was completed in 1886. In 1904, the church's parish was among the largest in the U.S. with close to 20,000 parishioners and nearly 2,000 children were enrolled in the school. The church contains an 1893 Johnson & Son pipe organ in the choir loft. There are three carrara marble altars in the sanctuary and the main altar is 34 ft high. In 1889, St. Stanislaus Bishop & Martyr Cemetery was established in nearby Cheektowaga, NY. The cemetery occupies 20 acres of land. In 1965, St. Stanislaus social center was constructed near the church.

Church Building
Ground breaking began on the present day church on August 10, 1882, and took nearly 4 years to complete. In 1908, the church steeples, bells, Cupolas, and 6.5 ft diameter clocks were installed at a cost of €40,000. The massive church towers rise to a height of 217 ft.

Restoration
On November 20, 2000, a storm with severe winds resulted in the removal of the cross and cupola on the left tower of St. Stanislaus. Restoration of the cupola was completed on July 11, 2003, at a cost of $300,000. Of that cost, only one third was covered by insurance. As a result of this restoration, the left and right cupola are no longer matching in color. In 2005, the church underwent its most extensive restoration and renovation in the churches history. The work included 8 new clock faces and 4 new clock bells in the clock towers. Restoration work to the church's 1893 Johnson pipe organ, maintenance to the stained glass and handmade wooden doors, a gold-leaf frieze applied to the vestibule and new lighting for the fountain statue. The total cost approached US$2 million.

Present day
In 2009 Thaddeus Bocianowski was named only the seventh pastor of the historic parish. As part of the Roman Catholic Church's ongoing downsizing campaign, the church was re-designated "a shrine to St. Stanislaus and all Polish martyrs" and a Polish cultural center on October 11, 2009, ostensibly due to the declining populace, which had impacted attendance at the church. In 2008, the school on Wilson street was closed after enrollment fell to only 75. The school had lasted 127 years and was staffed by Felician sisters for its entire history.

Gallery

See also
Buffalo, New York
East Side, Buffalo
Polish Cathedral style
St. Adalbert's Basilica
Jozef Mazur

References

External links 
 Stanislaus Church in Buffalo
 Image montage of the church
 PGSNYS history of the church
 City of Buffalo Preservation Board Survey
 Skyscraperpage building page
 Emporis building page

Tourist attractions in Buffalo, New York
Religious organizations established in 1873
Roman Catholic churches completed in 1882
19th-century Roman Catholic church buildings in the United States
Polish-American culture in Buffalo, New York
Polish Cathedral style architecture
Roman Catholic churches in Buffalo, New York
Buildings and structures in Buffalo, New York